Psychopatico is the second live album by the Danish rock group D-A-D, and the first to be published outside Japan. The album was released on November 20, 1998.
The recordings on the double album was made during the Mad Days Tour in the same year. At the Danish Grammy Awards 1999 the album was elected Danish Rock Album of the Year. Psychopatico contains a studio recording of the new track, "Jacketless in December" which was released as the first single of the album.

Track listing

CD1 
"Simpatico"
"Empty Heads"
"Bad Craziness"
"Grow Or Pay"
"Riding With Sue"
"Hate To Say..."
"I Won't Cut My Hair"
"Cloudy Hours"

CD2 
"Reconstrucdead"
"Black Crickets"
"Home Alone 5"
"Sleeping My Day Away"
"Jihad"
"Written In Water"
"It's After Dark"
"Laugh 'n' A 1/2"
"Jacketless In December"

Releases

References

External links
 This album on D-A-D's official homepage

1998 live albums
D.A.D. (band) albums